The 1983 MAAC men's basketball tournament was held March 10–12 at a combination of on-campus gymnasiums and the Meadowlands Arena in East Rutherford, New Jersey. This was the second edition of the tournament.

 upset top-seeded  in the championship game, 54–53, to win their first MAAC men's basketball tournament.

No MAAC team was invited to the NCAA tournament this year.

Format
All six of the conference's members participated in the tournament field. They were seeded based on regular season conference records, with the top two teams earning byes into the semifinal round. The other four teams entered into the preliminary first round. An additional third place game was also played on the last day of the tournament.

First Round games were played at the home court of the higher-seeded team. All remaining games were played at a neutral site at the Meadowlands Arena in East Rutherford, New Jersey.

Bracket

References

MAAC men's basketball tournament
1982–83 Metro Atlantic Athletic Conference men's basketball season
1983 in sports in New Jersey